Street Genius (formerly known as None of the Above) is a popular science TV series that airs on National Geographic Channel. It features scientific experiments related mainly to physics, chemistry and engineering performed by British presenter and engineer Tim Shaw to regular passers-by. The show is also currently available on Netflix in Brazil, Argentina, Colombia, Mexico, Costa Rica and Panama.

Format
In each episode, Tim Shaw walks about the streets inviting people to participate in or observe a scientific experiment. After the experiment is explained to them, Tim asks what they think the outcome will be. Once all participants or observers have given their opinions, Tim asks the viewers which, out of those predictions, will prove to be the correct one. "None of the above" is usually one of the multiple choice options presented, being the inspiration for the original title of the series in season 1. After the experiment is done, Tim then proceeds to explain why the correct option was right and the others were wrong, generally accompanied by on-screen graphical explanations and demonstrations in the form of images and animations.

Episodes

Season 1 (2013/2014)

Season 2 (2015)

References

External links
 Official Street Genius site at National Geographic Channel US
 Official Street Genius site at National Geographic Channel UK
 Old Official None of the Above site at National Geographic Channel UK
 None of the Above/Street Genius at IMDb

National Geographic (American TV channel) original programming
English-language television shows
Television shows set in Las Vegas
Television series by Warner Bros. Television Studios